Chalaroderma capito, the looseskin blenny, is a species of combtooth blenny found in the south Atlantic ocean where it is found from Saldanha Bay to East London in South Africa. This species reaches a length of  SL.

References

capito
Fish described in 1836
Taxa named by Achille Valenciennes